The Life & Casualty Tower (also known as the L & C Tower) is a skyscraper in Nashville, Tennessee located at 401 Church Street. It stands 152.5 meters (409 ft) and has 30 floors. It was designed by Edwin A. Keeble, with structural engineering done by Ross Bryan Associates, and was finished in 1957. It was Nashville's first true skyscraper and the tallest in Tennessee until 1965, when 100 North Main Street in Memphis surpassed it.

Exterior materials are limestone, granite, and bright green glass windows. Intersecting curves and angles at the building's base focus attention on the entrance, which angles out to the corner of Church Street and 4th Avenue.

In the building's early days, the L&C sign at its apex functioned as a weather beacon, changing color to indicate the weather forecast.

See also
Life and Casualty Insurance Company of Tennessee
List of tallest buildings in Nashville

References

External links
Emporis Listing

Skyscraper office buildings in Nashville, Tennessee

Office buildings completed in 1957
1957 establishments in Tennessee